This Is My Country is an album by the soul group the Impressions, released in 1968. It was their first album released on Curtis Mayfield's label, Curtom Records.

Production
"Gone Away" was written by Mayfield, Donny Hathaway, and Leroy Hutson. Hathaway also worked on "You Want Somebody Else".

Critical reception
The A.V. Club called the album inspiring and influential, writing that "even at its most syrupy, Mayfield gives his tunes elbow room, a muscular pulse, and an emotional complexity that's vengeful and redemptive all at once." In a retrospective article, The Independent called it one of the 20 best albums of 1968, writing that "Mayfield gave notice of his own black pride on the stirring title track on which he both celebrates and condemns the country that his people populate."

Track listing
All tracks composed by Curtis Mayfield; except where indicated
"They Don't Know" - 2:47
"Stay Close to Me" - 2:03
"I'm Loving Nothing" - 2:31
"Loves Happening" - 3:07
"Gone Away" (Donny Hathaway, Mayfield, Leroy Hutson) - 3:41
"You Want Somebody Else" (Billy Griffin, Donny Hathaway) - 3:12
"So Unusual" - 2:56
"My Woman's Love" - 3:02
"Fool for You" - 2:52
"This Is My Country" - 2:48

Personnel
Curtis Mayfield - producer

Charts

References

1968 albums
The Impressions albums
Albums produced by Curtis Mayfield
Charly Records albums
Sunspot Records albums
Curtom Records albums